Frederick John Gooder was a New Zealand cricketer active from 1884 to 1885 who played for Wellington cricket team 
Frederick appeared in one first-class match. 
Frederick was born in Wellington, New Zealand on 17 January 1862 and died in Wellington, New Zealand on 13 April 1948. 
He scored 10 runs, reaching 5 runs in each of his two innings.

Notes

1862 births
1948 deaths
New Zealand cricketers
Wellington cricketers